Barn (also known as Barn Halt) was a station located in the town of Carrickfergus in Northern Ireland. At one time it was part of a tight cluster of stations in the Carrickfergus area, each located one minute from the other.

The station closed in 1977 when Northern Ireland Railways services were cut back. All remnants of the station were cleared away during track re-laying in 1997, however its old footbridge still remains in use as a pedestrian crossing over the railway line..

References

Disused railway stations in County Antrim
Railway stations opened in 1925
Railway stations closed in 1977
Railway stations in Northern Ireland opened in the 20th century